Maksim Pavlovets (born 8 August 1996) is a Belarusian footballer.

References

External links
 
 
 Profile at teams.by

1996 births
Living people
Sportspeople from Pinsk
Belarusian footballers
Association football midfielders
FC Volna Pinsk players
FC Smolevichi players
FC Slavia Mozyr players
FC Granit Mikashevichi players
FC Krumkachy Minsk players